A Grande Família is a Brazilian television sitcom created by Oduvaldo Vianna Filho and Armando Costa which originally aired on Rede Globo from March 29, 2001 to September 11, 2014. The show tells the story of a typical middle-class family living in a suburb neighborhood of Rio de Janeiro. It is a remake of the series of the same name that aired in Brazil in the 1970s.

The family consists of a working father, Lineu, a housewife and mother, Nenê, their son Tuco, their daughter Bebel, and Bebel's fiancée, Agostinho, a taxi driver portrayed as the typical carioca malandro. The family's grandfather, Floriano, was written out of the story after the death of actor Rogério Cardoso.

In addition to being the longest-running Brazilian sitcom, the show it is considered one of the most popular comedy shows in Brazil.

A film based on the series premiered on January 10, 2007.

Plot
Lineu (Marco Nanini), the head of the family and quintessential patriarch, acts like a father to everyone in the house, including to his street-wise son-in-law, the hilarious Agostinho (Pedro Cardoso). Lineu is as methodical and strait-laced as Agostinho is roguish and full of mischief. Lineu is married to the sweet Nené (Marieta Severo), and unlike most long-married couples, they are still passionately in love.

Bebel (Guta Stresser) is their dreamer daughter whose head is constantly in the clouds. And, of course, she could only be married to Agostinho. This family couldn't be complete without the eternal teenager Tuco (Lúcio Mauro Filho), a real mommy's boy who doesn't get any breaks from his dad.

Cast and characters

Episodes

Reception

Awards and nominations

It has won many different awards, including 7 Extra Awards, 3 Arte e Qualidade, one APCA award and a nomination for an Emmy Award for the role of actor Pedro Cardoso.

References

External links
  
 

2001 Brazilian television series debuts
2014 Brazilian television series endings
Brazilian comedy television series
Mass media portrayals of the middle class
Portuguese-language television shows
Rede Globo original programming
Television shows adapted into films
Television series about families
Television shows set in Rio de Janeiro (city)